Medicine, Health Care and Philosophy is a quarterly peer-reviewed medical journal covering the intersection of philosophy and medicine, including bioethics. It was established in 1987 as European Philosophy of Medicine and Health Care, obtaining its current name in 1998. It is published by Springer Science+Business Media in association with the European Society for Philosophy of Medicine and Healthcare, of which it is the official journal. The editors-in-chief are Bert Gordijn (Dublin City University) and Henk ten Have (Duquesne University). According to the Journal Citation Reports, the journal has a 2018 impact factor of 1.450.

References

External links

Health Info Site

Healthcare journals
Bioethics journals
Publications established in 1987
Quarterly journals
Springer Science+Business Media academic journals
Academic journals associated with international learned and professional societies of Europe
Philosophy of medicine